Liolaemus arambarensis is a species of lizard in the family  Liolaemidae. It is native to Brazil.

References

arambarensis
Reptiles described in 2003
Reptiles of Brazil